"Cherveno zname" swim complex in Sofia, Bulgaria was the biggest swimming venue on the Balkan peninsula.

It was built in 1985 to host the European Aquatics Championships.

There were three indoor pools:
 Olympic swimming pool (50m lane),
 deep pool for diving and synchronized swimming,
 children’s pool for beginners.

Outdoor pools:
 Olympic swimming pool (50 m lane),
 deep pool for diving.

It was totally renovated in 2009 (costs: ~6mio Euros).

Over the years it hosted many Bulgarian meets in swimming and synchronized swimming.

The swim complex was closed in 2015.

Coordinates: 42°40'26"N, 23°22'23"E

References

Sports venues in Sofia
Swimming in Bulgaria
Swimming venues